United Nations Security Council resolution 1488, adopted unanimously on 26 June 2003, after considering a report by the Secretary-General Kofi Annan regarding the United Nations Disengagement Observer Force (UNDOF), the Council extended its mandate for a further six months until 31 December 2003.

The resolution called upon the parties concerned to immediately implement Resolution 338 (1973) and requested that the Secretary-General submit a report on the situation at the end of that period.

The Secretary-General's report pursuant to the previous resolution on UNDOF said that the situation between Israel and Syria had remained generally calm, though the situation in the Middle East as a whole remained dangerous until a settlement could be reached. He also reported two incidents where one Syrian soldier was killed and another captured; the soldier was subsequently released through UNDOF intervention.

See also
 Arab–Israeli conflict
 Golan Heights
 Israel–Syria relations
 List of United Nations Security Council Resolutions 1401 to 1500 (2002–2003)
 2000–2006 Shebaa Farms conflict

References

External links
 
Text of the Resolution at undocs.org

 1488
 1488
 1488
2003 in Israel
2003 in Syria
June 2003 events